Rockford is a city in Kent County in the U.S. state of Michigan.  The population was 5,719 at the 2010 census.

History
The area was first settled by Marlin Hunter, who settled along the Rogue River in 1842.  By 1845, several other families arrived and settled the community under the name Laphamville, and the community received a post office under that name.  The community was platted in 1865 and incorporated as a village in 1866.  At that time, the community's name changed to Rockford.  The community was originally based around the lumber industry but was soon supported by a shoe factory and tannery at the turn of the century.  The village incorporated as a city in 1935.

Wolverine World Wide has major operations in the city for over 100 years. In modern times, its former tannery site used Scotchgard chemicals to waterproof shoes, which contaminated local areas with the active ingredients at the time of PFOA and PFOS.

The downtown area hosts a summer farmer's market on Saturday. The city also hosts a Fall Harvest Festival.  Start of Summer Celebration is a community organization annually held in early June at the beginning of summertime.

Geography

White Pine Trail State Park runs through the downtown area of Rockford, next to the Rogue River and the Rockford Dam.

Indian Trails provides daily intercity bus service between Grand Rapids, Michigan and St. Ignace.

Education
Rockford is served by the Rockford Public Schools. The city is served by the Kent District Library. Rockford Christian School, a campus of Grand Rapids Christian Schools, is in Rockford. In 2021, a Rockford High School student presented a 137-page report describing a culture of racism present at Rockford Public Schools in an effort to find solutions for the problem, with multiple students describing experiences of racism in the school district. The acting superintendent of Rockford Public Schools described the report as "more confusing than enlightening" and that society as a whole had issues with racism.

Demographics

2010 census
As of the census of 2010, there were 5,719 people, 2,201 households, and 1,537 families living in the city. The racial makeup of the city was 95.0% White, 0.7% African American, 0.5% Native American, 1.2% Asian, 0.1% Pacific Islander, 0.7% from other races, and 2.0% from two or more races. Hispanic or Latino of any race were 3.7% of the population.

There were 2,201 households, of which 42.1% had children under the age of 18 living with them, 51.7% were married couples living together, 13.7% had a female householder with no husband present, 4.5% had a male householder with no wife present, and 30.2% were non-families. 26.7% of all households were made up of individuals, and 10.7% had someone living alone who was 65 years of age or older. The average household size was 2.58 and the average family size was 3.16.

The median age in the city was 33.7 years. 30.9% of residents were under the age of 18; 7% were between the ages of 18 and 24; 27.8% were from 25 to 44; 23.6% were from 45 to 64; and 10.7% were 65 years of age or older. The gender makeup of the city was 47.4% male and 52.6% female.

The median income for a household in the city was $53,113, and the median income for a family was $71,700. Males had a median income of $62,015 versus $33,325 for females. The per capita income for the city was $28,632. About 10.5% of families and 11.7% of the population were below the poverty line, including 18.5% of those under age 18 and 7.2% of those age 65 or over.

2000 census
As of the census of 2000, there were 4,626 people, 1,741 households, and 1,255 families living in the city. The racial makeup of the city was 96.20% White, 0.61% African American, 0.39% Native American, 0.91% Asian, 0.02% Pacific Islander, 0.63% from other races, and 1.25% from two or more races. Hispanic or Latino of any race were 1.51% of the population.

There were 1,741 households, out of which 45.7% had children under the age of 18 living with them, 54.1% were married couples living together, 14.9% had a female householder with no husband present, and 27.9% were non-families. 25.3% of all households were made up of individuals, and 11.3% had someone living alone who was 65 years of age or older. The average household size was 2.65 and the average family size was 3.21.

In the city, the population was spread out, with 33.9% under the age of 18, 7.1% from 18 to 24, 33.0% from 25 to 44, 17.1% from 45 to 64, and 9.0% who were 65 years of age or older.  The median age was 32 years. For every 100 females, there were 92.6 males.  For every 100 females age 18 and over, there were 80.9 males.

The median income for a household in the city was $50,562, and the median income for a family was $55,954. Males had a median income of $45,847 versus $28,024 for females. The per capita income for the city was $19,906.  About 8.4% of families and 8.1% of the population were below the poverty line, including 10.7% of those under age 18 and 12.9% of those age 65 or over.

Notable people
 Brent Bookwalter, cyclist and participant in 2010 Tour de France
 Andrew Britton, author
 Parker Ehinger, lineman for NFL's Kansas City Chiefs
 Jason Hartmann, distance runner, 4th-place finisher in 2012 Boston Marathon
 Adam Kieft, lineman with NFL's Cincinnati Bengals
 Julia A. Moore, poet 
 Dathan Ritzenhein, Olympic distance runner, former American 5k record holder
 John C. Sjogren, Army soldier and Medal of Honor recipient in World War II
 Joe Staley, left tackle for San Francisco 49ers
 Dick York, actor, best known for playing Darrin Stephens on 1960s sitcom Bewitched
 Ginger Zee, meteorologist for ABC News and Good Morning America

References

External links
Rockford official website
History and directory of Kent County, Michigan. Dillenback & Leavitt. Grand Rapids, Mich.: Daily eagle steam printing house, 1870. pp. 25+.

Cities in Kent County, Michigan
Grand Rapids metropolitan area
1842 establishments in Michigan
Populated places established in 1842